Lacock is a village and civil parish in the county of Wiltshire, England.

Lacock or LaCock may also refer to:

People
 Joanne Dru (1922–1996), born Joan Letitia LaCock, American film and television actress
 Abner Lacock (1770–1837), American surveyor, civil engineer, and politician 
 Pete LaCock (b. 1952), American professional baseball player
 Peter Marshall (entertainer) (b. 1926), born Ralph Pierre LaCock, American entertainer

Other uses
 Lacock Abbey, an historic house in Lacock, Wiltshire, England
 Lacock Abbey (monastery), a former monastery in Lacock, Wiltshire, England

See also
 Lacock Cup
 Laycock, a surname
Laycock, West Yorkshire
 Leacock (disambiguation)